The lamulate shrew (Chodsigoa lamula) is a species of mammal in the family Soricidae. It is endemic to China.

References

Red-toothed shrews
Mammals of China
Taxonomy articles created by Polbot
Mammals described in 1912
Taxa named by Oldfield Thomas